Pagan Records is an independent extreme metal record label based in Poland. Their roster includes bands such as Azarath, Behemoth, Christ Agony and other black metal bands.

Bands 

Current
 Blasphemy Rites
 Blaze of Perdition
 Bloodthirst
 Demonic Slaughter
 Furia
 Gortal
 Massemord
 Mord'A'Stigmata
 Mordhell
 Misteria 
 Pandemonium
 Strandhogg
 Throneum
 Thy Worshiper
 Voidhanger

Former
 Anima Damnata
 Azarath
 Behemoth
 Christ Agony
 CSSABA
 Damnation
 Esqarial
 Hell-Born
 Hellveto
 Hermh
 Imperator (disbanded)
 Luna Ad Noctum
 Lux Occulta
 Moon
 Nightly Gale
 Nominon
 Non Opus Dei
 North
 Profanum (disbanded)
 Revelation of Doom
 Sacrilegium
 Sathanas
 Stillborn
 Trauma
 Varathron
 Witchmaster

References

External links
 Official website

Polish independent record labels
Black metal record labels